is the railway station in Emukae-chō Tanomoto-men, Sasebo, Nagasaki Prefecture. It is operated by Matsuura Railway and is on the Nishi-Kyūshū Line.

Lines
Matsuura Railway
Nishi-Kyūshū Line

Adjacent stations

Station layout
The station is ground level with a single side platform.

Environs
National Route 204
Senryū Tokuda Hospital
Inotsuki Post Office
Emukai Town Cultural Center
Senryūgataki Waterfall
Fukuigawa Bridge

History
1939-01-25 - Opens for business as JGR  .
1987-04-01 - Railways privatize and this station is inherited by JR Kyushu.
1988-04-01 - This station is inherited by Matsuura Railway and renamed to present name.

References
Nagasaki statistical yearbook (Nagasaki prefectural office statistics section,Japanese)

External links
Matsuura Railway (Japanese)

Railway stations in Japan opened in 1939
Railway stations in Nagasaki Prefecture